Julie Bonaparte may refer to:
Julie Clary (1771–1845), wife of Joseph Bonaparte, Queen Consort of Spain and Naples
Zénaïde Bonaparte (1801–1854), her daughter